David Julius Flick (born April 27, 1980) is a former professional Canadian football receiver. He played in the Canadian Football League with the Ottawa Renegades, Hamilton Tiger-Cats, and Saskatchewan Roughriders.

Flick played four seasons of college football with Slippery Rock University.

Mr. Flick is currently the head varsity football coach for the Warrior Run School District in Northumberland County, Pennsylvania. He signed a one-year contract for the 2016 season and was offered another one-year contract for the 2017 season on January 23, 2017. The Warrior Run School District Varsity Football team had a regular-season record of 4 wins and 6 losses in Flick's first season with the program.

References

External links
Saskatchewan Roughriders profile
CFL profile

1980 births
Living people
African-American players of Canadian football
American football wide receivers
Canadian football wide receivers
Hamilton Tiger-Cats players
Ottawa Renegades players
Sportspeople from Williamsport, Pennsylvania
Players of American football from Pennsylvania
Saskatchewan Roughriders players
Slippery Rock football players
21st-century African-American sportspeople
20th-century African-American people